Richard Dronskowski (born 11 November 1961, in Brilon) is a German chemist and physicist. He is a full professor at the RWTH Aachen University.

Life 
Dronskowski studied chemistry and physics at the University of Münster from 1981 to 1986. He completed his chemistry diploma with Bernt Krebs and Arndt Simon in 1987. He finished his physics diploma with Ole Krogh Andersen and Johannes Pollmann in 1989. He received his doctorate under supervision of Arndt Simon at the University of Stuttgart. From 1991 to 1992, he was a visiting scientist in the group of Roald Hoffmann at Cornell University. In 1995, he finished his habilitation at the University of Dortmund. Since 1997, he is a full professor at the RWTH Aachen University.

Research 
His research focuses on the following topics:

 solid-state chemistry
 quantum chemistry
 nitrides
 carbodiimides
 guanidinates
 intermetallics
 steel
 phase-change materials
 chemical bonding (e.g., Crystal Orbital Hamilton Populations)
 ab initio thermochemistry
 structural chemistry
 neutron diffraction

Awards 

 1990 Otto Hahn Medal (Max Planck Society)
 1996 Prize of Angewandte Chemie
 1997 Chemistry Lecturer Prize (Fonds der chemischen Industrie)
 2014 Distinguished Professorship (RWTH Aachen University)
 2015 Innovation Award (RWTH Aachen University)
 2017 Egon Wiberg Lecture (Ludwig Maximilian University of Munich)

Selected publications

References

External links
 

Living people
21st-century German chemists
21st-century German physicists
1961 births
Academic staff of RWTH Aachen University
Solid state chemists
University of Münster alumni
University of Stuttgart alumni
Academic staff of the Technical University of Dortmund